Aubrey Robert David (born 11 October 1990) is a professional footballer who plays as a defender for Liga FPD club Alajuelense. Born in Guyana, he represents the Trinidad and Tobago national team.

David began his professional football career in 2009, at the age of 18, with FC South End in Trinidad and Tobago. In the middle of his second season with the club, he transferred to fellow TT Pro League club Joe Public. However, after the Eastern Lions withdrew from the league at the end of the season, David signed with the Electricity Boys of promoted club T&TEC. In July 2012, he decided to switch to Caledonia AIA and won the FA Trophy in 2012–13. In his second season with the Stallions, he was loaned to FF Jaro for the 2014 Veikkausliiga season.

David is an international footballer having made his debut for Trinidad and Tobago in February 2012. However, David also represented his native Guyana in friendlies against Jamaica and Panama in May 2012, before making a one-time switch back to the Soca Warriors in November 2012. David helped lead Trinidad and Tobago to the 2007 FIFA U-17 World Cup and the 2009 FIFA U-20 World Cup as a youth; and most recently represented the senior team at the 2013 CONCACAF Gold Cup.

Club career

Caledonia AIA
After his brief stint with the Golden Jaguars of Guyana in May 2012, David followed then national team manager Jamaal Shabazz to Pro League club Caledonia AIA prior to the 2012–13 season. He made his debut for the Stallions of Morvant/Laventille during the group stage of the 2012–13 CONCACAF Champions League against Seattle Sounders FC of Major League Soccer on 2 August 2012.

Loan to FF Jaro (2014)
On 26 February 2014, David traveled to Jakobstad for a trial with Finnish club FF Jaro of the Veikkausliiga.

During his two-week trial with the club, David made his debut for FF Jaro of the Veikkausliiga in a league cup match against SJK on 1 March 2014. After a solid performance, Aubrey joined the club on a one-year loan for the 2014 season after agreeing to personal terms. Two weeks later, David started in defence at left-back during a 2–1 defeat to Kakkonen club FC Hämeenlinna in the third round of the Suomen Cup. He made his league debut as a starter in defence for FF Jaro on 6 April in a 1–0 loss to HJK. David scored his first league goal for FF Jaro against KuPS in the 52nd minute after heading in a free kick from Hendrik Helmke on 19 April. Afterwards, he solidified a place as the left-back during the club's first ten matches to lead FF Jaro to third in the league table. Aubrey continued his consistent form over the next two months before yellow card accumulation ended his 18-consecutive match streak on 6 July 2014.

Two weeks later, Aubrey returned to score his second goal of the season in the 62nd minute during a 5–0 win over FC Honka.

Shakhter Karagandy
In February 2015, David went on trial with FC Shakhter Karagandy of the Kazakhstan Premier League, going on to sign a one-year contract with the option of a second.

Deportivo Saprissa
In December 2015, David signed with Deportivo Saprissa, the most successful club of the Costa Rican Primera División and CONCACAF, going on to sign a one-year contract with the option of a second.

FC Dallas
On June 28, 2016, Deportivo Saprissa announced David would go on a six-month loan to FC Dallas with an option to buy.

PS Kemi
On 26 February 2017, David signed for Palloseura Kemi Kings on a two-year contract.

VPS
On 6 February 2018, VPS announced the signing of David on a one-year contract.

Return to Deportivo Saprissa
On 17 December 2018, David rejoined Deportivo Saprissa for the 2019 season.

International career
David has represented Trinidad and Tobago on various levels of international competition, having been capped for the under-17, under-20, under-23 Olympic team, and the Trinidad and Tobago national teams. He has also been capped for the Guyana national team in May 2012.

Youth teams
He began his international career for the under-17 team during the 2007 CONCACAF U-17 Tournament, where he made four appearances including two starts to lead the Soca Warriors to qualification for the 2007 FIFA U-17 World Cup in South Korea. David was part of the T&T outfit that beat Jamaica 1–0 in the final CONCACAF qualifying match in Kingston to qualify for the 2007 FIFA Under 17 World Cup in South Korea, that winning goal being scored by Kevin Molino.

During the 2007 FIFA U17 World Cup, David made one appearance after he came on as a late second-half substitute for Aaron Maund in Trinidad and Tobago's final match against Germany.

In March 2009, Aubrey represented the under-20 team as hosts during the 2009 CONCACAF U-20 Championship. David made two starts in a 1–0 win over Canada and in a scoreless draw against Costa Rica to secure qualification for the 2009 FIFA U-20 World Cup. Later that year, in Egypt, David came on as a substitute in the 63rd minute for Akeem Adams in a 2–1 loss to Italy, which eliminated the Soca Warriors from the competition. Two years later, David made two appearances in defence for the under-23 team during its Caribbean qualification phase for the CONCACAF Olympic qualification tournament in the United States. However, he did not make the final squad during the team's unsuccessful qualification for the 2012 Summer Olympics in London.

Senior teams

David made his full international debut for the Trinidad and Tobago national team on 29 February 2012 against Antigua and Barbuda at the age of 21. However, following the Soca Warriors''' elimination, at the hands of Guyana, from qualification attempt for the 2014 FIFA World Cup, David accepted an invitation to represent his native Guyana. In May 2012, David made his debut for the Golden Jaguars in a pair of friendlies against Jamaica and Panama. The following month, Aubrey did not feature for Guyana in the team's two losses against Mexico and Costa Rica during the third round of qualification. As a result, David decided to make a one-time international switch back to Trinidad and Tobago in November 2012.

2013 CONCACAF Gold Cup
On 16 November 2012, David scored his first international goal in his return debut for the Soca Warriors in a 3–0 win against Suriname. Aubrey went on to receive five international caps to lead the national team through qualification and a runners-up finish in the 2012 Caribbean Cup to qualify for the country's first CONCACAF Gold Cup in six years. In the build-up to the Gold Cup, David appeared as a defender in a pair of friendlies against Peru in February and March 2013. He also started in a 1–0 loss to Estonia on 7 June during the national team's first visit to European soil since the 2006 FIFA World Cup in Germany. After the Gold Cup draw, Trinidad and Tobago entered Group B along with El Salvador, Haiti, and Honduras. Based on his performance in the previous friendlies, Aubrey was named in the final squad for the 2013 CONCACAF Gold Cup on 28 July.

Although David did not appear in the Soca Warriors first group match against El Salvador, he came on as an early second-half substitute for injured Joevin Jones at left-back during the team's second match against Haiti. In the final group match between the Warriors and Honduras, David again replaced Jones as a late substitute to secure a 2–0 win and help Trinidad and Tobago advance to the quarterfinals for the first time since 2000. In the quarterfinals against Mexico, David made his first start of the tournament after Joevin Jones suffered from a hamstring injury prior to the match.

Post Gold Cup friendlies
Two months after the 2013 CONCACAF Gold Cup, Trinidad and Tobago accepted an invitation to compete in the 2013 OSN Cup in Saudi Arabia. David started in defence for the Soca Warriors during their semifinal match against United Arab Emirates. However, after Trinidad and Tobago conceded their third goal, Aubrey was substituted for Sheldon Bateau in the 55th minute. David was left off the roster, in favor of Bateau, for a friendly match against New Zealand in October 2013. David returned to the national team the following month and made consecutive starts during a pair of matches against Caribbean rivals Jamaica.

Career statistics

Club

International

International appearances

International goals
Scores and results list Trinidad and Tobago's goal tally first.

HonoursJoe Public Digicel Pro Bowl: 2011Caledonia AIA FA Trophy: 2012–13FC Dallas U.S. Open Cup: 2016
 Supporters' Shield: 2016Saprissa'''
 Liga FPD: Clausura 2020, Clausura 2021
 CONCACAF League: 2019

References

External links
 Aubrey David at Kakkonen Pohjoinen
 
 

1990 births
Living people
Sportspeople from Georgetown, Guyana
Association football defenders
Trinidad and Tobago footballers
Trinidad and Tobago international footballers
Guyanese footballers
Guyana international footballers
Guyanese emigrants to Trinidad and Tobago
Afro-Guyanese people
FC South End players
Joe Public F.C. players
Morvant Caledonia United players
TT Pro League players
FF Jaro players
Expatriate footballers in Finland
Trinidad and Tobago expatriate footballers
Trinidad and Tobago expatriate sportspeople in Costa Rica
Veikkausliiga players
Dual internationalists (football)
2013 CONCACAF Gold Cup players
2014 Caribbean Cup players
2015 CONCACAF Gold Cup players
FC Dallas players
Major League Soccer players
Kazakhstan Premier League players
Liga FPD players
Expatriate footballers in Kazakhstan
Expatriate footballers in Costa Rica
2009 CONCACAF U-20 Championship players
2019 CONCACAF Gold Cup players
Deportivo Saprissa players
2021 CONCACAF Gold Cup players